Šebastovce is a borough (city ward) of Košice, Slovakia. Along with Poľov and Šaca, it is the southernmost of Košice's 22 boroughs, and the southernmost of the Košice IV boroughs.

History 
The village of Šebastovce first appeared in written records in 1248.

In the 20th century, Šebastovce lost village municipality status and was annexed to Košice as one of its boroughs.

Statistics

 Area: 
 Population: 732 (31 December 2017) 
 Density of population: 140/km2 (31 December 2017) 
 District: Košice IV
 Mayor: Monika Puzderová (as of 2018 elections)

References

External links

 Official website of the Šebastovce borough
 Article on the Šebastovce borough at Cassovia.sk
 Official website of Košice

Boroughs of Košice
Villages in Slovakia merged with towns